Elephant Marsh lies on the flood plain of the Lower Shire River in the African country of Malawi between the towns of Chikwawa and Nsanje.  The marsh varies in size from 150 to 450 square miles depending on the flow of the Shire and Ruo rivers and has no permanent boundary.  In some places, floating mats of vegetation are so thick boat travel is nearly impossible.  The Ruo River, the largest tributary of the Shire and the southeastern boundary between Malawi and Mozambique, merges with the Shire in the Elephant Marsh.

The marsh was named by David Livingstone in 1859, who counted as many as 800 elephants in one sighting.  Today the elephants are largely gone, but the Elephant Marsh supports a large number of aquatic birds.  Crocodiles are also very common.  The marsh is similar to swampy Lake Chilwa, located two hundred miles to the north. Boat trips through Elephant Marsh can be arranged from nearby Lengwe National Park.

References

Geography of Southern Region, Malawi
Wetlands of Malawi
Wetlands of Africa
Marshes
Ramsar sites in Malawi